Joanna Johnston is an English costume designer who has worked extensively in film, particularly in America. She is especially known for her collaborations with Steven Spielberg and Robert Zemeckis.

Life and career
Initially, Johnston worked in the theatre, but in 1978, she became the assistant costume designer (albeit uncredited) on Death on the Nile. This was followed the next year by work on Roman Polanski's Tess. Still an assistant costume designer, Johnston worked for the first time with Spielberg on Indiana Jones and the Temple of Doom (1984) and The Color Purple (1985).

Her first feature film costume design credit was Hellraiser (1987). A year later she worked with Robert Zemeckis on the highly successful Who Framed Roger Rabbit. The working relationship with Zemeckis continued through Back to the Future Part II (1989), Back to the Future Part III (1990), Death Becomes Her (1992), Contact (1997), Cast Away (2000), The Polar Express (2004), and Allied (2016) for which she received her second nomination for an Academy Award for Best Costume Design.

In 1989, Spielberg hired her as designer on Indiana Jones and the Last Crusade and they worked together again on Saving Private Ryan (1998), War of the Worlds (2005), Munich (also 2005) and War Horse (2011). Their latest collaboration is Lincoln for which she received her first nomination for an Academy Award for Best Costume Design, but lost to three-time nominee Jacqueline Durran, respectively.

Johnston also designed the costumes for two of M. Night Shyamalan's first features The Sixth Sense (1999) and Unbreakable (2000).

She currently lives in America.

Filmography

References

External links
 

Year of birth missing (living people)
Living people
English emigrants to the United States
English costume designers
Women costume designers